Tomi Lotta (born 1 January 1976) is a Finnish strongman competitor. He has competed in both the World's Strongest Man and IFSA Strongman World Championships, but failed to make the finals in both events. His career best win is the 2004 Finland's Strongest Man title. He is known by his nickname "the Finnish Beach Boy". Lotta officially broke the Guinness world record for the forward hold while competing in Rome on March 5, 2010. His record setting time was 20 kg(44 lbs.) for 76.73 seconds.

Personal Records
Squat - 350 kg(770 lbs.)
 Bench Press - 230 kg(506 lbs.)
 Deadlift - 340 kg(748 lbs.)

References

Finnish strength athletes
Living people
1976 births